Philology is the study of language in oral and written historical sources; it is the intersection of textual criticism, literary criticism, history, and linguistics (with especially strong ties to etymology). Philology is also defined as the study of literary texts as well as oral and written records, the establishment of their authenticity and their original form, and the determination of their meaning. A person who pursues this kind of study is known as a philologist.

In older usage, especially British, philology is more general, covering comparative and historical linguistics.

Classical philology studies classical languages. Classical philology principally originated from the Library of Pergamum and the Library of Alexandria around the fourth century BC, continued by Greeks and Romans throughout the Roman/Byzantine Empire. It was eventually resumed by European scholars of the Renaissance, where it was soon joined by philologies of other European (Germanic, Celtic), Eurasian (Slavistics, etc.), Asian (Arabic, Persian, Sanskrit, Chinese, etc.), and African (Egyptian, Nubian, etc.) languages. Indo-European studies involve the comparative philology of all Indo-European languages.

Philology, with its focus on historical development (diachronic analysis), is contrasted with linguistics due to Ferdinand de Saussure's insistence on the importance of synchronic analysis. While the contrast continued with the emergence of structuralism and the emphasis of Noam Chomsky on syntax, research in historical linguistics often relies on philological materials and findings.

Etymology 
The term changed little with the Latin philologia, and later entered the English language in the 16th century, from the Middle French philologie, in the sense of 'love of literature'.

The adjective  (philólogos) meant 'fond of discussion or argument, talkative', in Hellenistic Greek, also implying an excessive ("sophistic") preference of argument over the love of true wisdom,  (philósophos).

As an allegory of literary erudition, philologia appears in fifth-century postclassical literature (Martianus Capella, De nuptiis Philologiae et Mercurii), an idea revived in Late Medieval literature (Chaucer, Lydgate).

The meaning of "love of learning and literature" was narrowed to "the study of the historical development of languages" (historical linguistics) in 19th-century usage of the term. Due to the rapid progress made in understanding sound laws and language change, the "golden age of philology" lasted throughout the 19th century, or "from Giacomo Leopardi and Friedrich Schlegel to Nietzsche".

Branches

Comparative 

The comparative linguistics branch of philology studies the relationship between languages. Similarities between Sanskrit and European languages were first noted in the early 16th century and led to speculation of a common ancestor language from which all these descended. It is now named Proto-Indo-European. Philology's interest in ancient languages led to the study of what were, in the 18th century, "exotic" languages, for the light they could cast on problems in understanding and deciphering the origins of older texts.

Textual 

Philology also includes the study of texts and their history. It includes elements of textual criticism, trying to reconstruct an author's original text based on variant copies of manuscripts. This branch of research arose among ancient scholars in the Greek-speaking world of the 4th century BC, who desired to establish a standard text of popular authors for the purposes of both sound interpretation and secure transmission. Since that time, the original principles of textual criticism have been improved and applied to other widely distributed texts such as the Bible. Scholars have tried to reconstruct the original readings of the Bible from the manuscript variants. This method was applied to Classical Studies and to medieval texts as a way to reconstruct the author's original work. The method produced so-called "critical editions", which provided a reconstructed text accompanied by a "critical apparatus", i.e., footnotes that listed the various manuscript variants available, enabling scholars to gain insight into the entire manuscript tradition and argue about the variants.

A related study method known as higher criticism studies the authorship, date, and provenance of text to place such text in historical context. As these philological issues are often inseparable from issues of interpretation, there is no clear-cut boundary between philology and hermeneutics. When text has a significant political or religious influence (such as the reconstruction of Biblical texts), scholars have difficulty reaching objective conclusions.

Some scholars avoid all critical methods of textual philology, especially in historical linguistics, where it is important to study the actual recorded materials. The movement known as New Philology has rejected textual criticism because it injects editorial interpretations into the text and destroys the integrity of the individual manuscript, hence damaging the reliability of the data. Supporters of New Philology insist on a strict "diplomatic" approach: a faithful rendering of the text exactly as found in the manuscript, without emendations.

Cognitive 

Another branch of philology, cognitive philology, studies written and oral texts. Cognitive philology considers these oral texts as the results of human mental processes. This science compares the results of textual science with the results of experimental research of both psychology and artificial intelligence production systems.

Decipherment 
In the case of Bronze Age literature, philology includes the prior decipherment of the language under study. This has notably been the case with the Egyptian, Sumerian, Assyrian, Hittite, Ugaritic and Luwian languages. Beginning with the famous decipherment and translation of the Rosetta Stone by Jean-François Champollion in 1822, a number of individuals attempted to decipher the writing systems of the Ancient Near East and Aegean. In the case of Old Persian and Mycenaean Greek, decipherment yielded older records of languages already known from slightly more recent traditions (Middle Persian and Alphabetic Greek).

Work on the ancient languages of the Near East progressed rapidly. In the mid-19th century, Henry Rawlinson and others deciphered the Behistun Inscription, which records the same text in Old Persian, Elamite, and Akkadian, using a variation of cuneiform for each language. The elucidation of cuneiform led to the decipherment of Sumerian. Hittite was deciphered in 1915 by Bedřich Hrozný.

Linear B, a script used in the ancient Aegean, was deciphered in 1952 by Michael Ventris and John Chadwick, who demonstrated that it recorded an early form of Greek, now known as Mycenaean Greek. Linear A, the writing system that records the still-unknown language of the Minoans, resists deciphering, despite many attempts.

Work continues on scripts such as the Maya, with great progress since the initial breakthroughs of the phonetic approach championed by Yuri Knorozov and others in the 1950s. Since the late 20th century, the Maya code has been almost completely deciphered, and the Mayan languages are among the most documented and studied in Mesoamerica. The code is described as a logosyllabic style of writing, which could be used to fully express any spoken thought.

Contention 
In the Anglo-Saxon world, the term philology to describe work on languages and literatures, which had become synonymous with the practices of German scholars, was abandoned as a consequence of anti-German feeling following World War I. Most continental European countries still maintain the term to designate departments, colleges, position titles, and journals. J. R. R. Tolkien opposed the nationalist reaction against philological practices, claiming that "the philological instinct" was "universal as is the use of language". In British English usage, and in British academia, philology remains largely synonymous with "historical linguistics", while in US English, and US academia, the wider meaning of "study of a language's grammar, history and literary tradition" remains more widespread. Based on the harsh critique of Friedrich Nietzsche, some US scholars since the 1980s have viewed philology as responsible for a narrowly scientistic study of language and literature.

Disagreements in the modern day of this branch of study are followed with the likes of how the method is treated amongst other scholars, as noted by both the philologists R.D Fulk and Leonard Neidorf who have been quoted saying "This field "philology's commitment to falsification renders it "at odds with what many literary scholars believe, because the purpose of philology is to narrow the range of possible interpretations rather than to treat all reasonable ones as equal". This use of falsification can be seen in the debate surrounding the etymology of the Old English character Unferth from the heroic epic poem Beowulf.

James Turner further disagrees with how the use of the term is dismissed in the academic world, stating that due to its branding as a "simpleminded approach to their subject" that the term has become unknown to college-educated students, furthering the stereotypes of "scrutiny of ancient Greek or Roman texts of a nit-picking classicist" and only the "technical research into languages and families".

In popular culture 

In the Space Trilogy by C.S. Lewis, the main character, Elwin Ransom, is a philologist – as was Lewis' close friend J. R. R. Tolkien.

Dr. Edward Morbius, one of the main characters in the science fiction film Forbidden Planet, is a philologist.

Philip, the main character of Christopher Hampton's 'bourgeois comedy' The Philanthropist, is a professor of philology in an English university town.

Moritz-Maria von Igelfeld, the main character in Alexander McCall Smith's 1997 comic novel Portuguese Irregular Verbs is a philologist, educated at Cambridge.

The main character in the Academy Award Nominee for Best Foreign Language film in 2012, Footnote, is a Hebrew philologist, and a significant part of the film deals with his work.

A main character of the science fiction TV show Stargate SG-1, Dr. Daniel Jackson, is mentioned as having a PhD in philology.

See also 
 American Journal of Philology
 Codicology
 Elocution
 Etymology
 Palaeography
 Stylistics
 Textual scholarship
 Western canon

References

External links 

 Philology in Runet—(A special web search through the philological sites of Runet)
 v: Topic:German philology
 CogLit: Literature and Cognitive Linguistics
 A Bibliography of Literary Theory, Criticism, and Philology (ed. José Ángel García Landa, University of Zaragoza, Spain)

 
Academic disciplines
Historical linguistics
Writing
Textual scholarship